Wilhelminaplein is an underground subway station in Rotterdam, Netherlands, which lies south of the Maas river. It is part of Rotterdam Metro lines D and E.

Wilhelminaplein station was opened in 1997 as a new infill station of the North-South Line, which itself was already opened in 1968. Because the station was constructed at the location where the metro tunnel is going up on its way to the surface, the platforms, like the rest of the station, are not entirely horizontal.

Near the main entrance of the station, a Rotterdam tram stop is located, allowing interchange with RET-operated tram lines 20, 23 and 25. A connection to RET-bus line 60 towards the Wilhelminakade is also available.

An entrance was opened in 2005 for visitors to the Nieuwe Luxor Theater, which leads passengers directly to the other side of the busy intersection of Wilhelminaplein and Posthumalaan by moving walkways.

External links

Rotterdam Metro stations
RandstadRail stations in Rotterdam
Railway stations opened in 1997
1997 establishments in the Netherlands
Railway stations in the Netherlands opened in the 20th century
Railway stations in the Netherlands opened in the 1960s